Madrigalejo is a municipality located in the province of Cáceres, Extremadura, Spain. According to the 2006 census (INE), the municipality has a population of 2075 inhabitants. Ferdinand II of Aragon died in this village in 1516.

References 

Municipalities in the Province of Cáceres